Between 1977 and 2000, Digital Equipment Corporation (DEC) produced a wide range of computer systems under the VAX brand, all based on various implementations of the DEC-proprietary instruction set architecture of the same name.

VAX-11 

 VAX-11/780
 VAX-11/750
 VAX-11/751
 VAX-11/730
 VAX-11/782
 VAX-11/784
 VAX-11/785
 VAX-11/787
 VAX-11/788
 VAX-11/725

VAX 8000 

 VAX 8600
 VAX 8650
 VAX 8x00
 VAX 8500
 VAX 8530
 VAX 8550
 VAX 8700
 VAX 8800
 VAX 8810/8820/8830/8840
 VAX 8974
 VAX 8978

MicroVAX 

 MicroVAX I
 MicroVAX II
 Industrial VAX 630
 MicroVAX III
 MicroVAX III+
 VAX 4
 MicroVAX 2000
 MicroVAX 3100 Model 10
 MicroVAX 3100 Model 10e
 MicroVAX 3100 Model 20 (also sold with different firmware as an Infoserver 100)
 MicroVAX 3100 Model 20e
 MicroVAX 3100 Model 30
 MicroVAX 3100 Model 40
 MicroVAX 3100 Model 80
 MicroVAX 3100 Model 85
 MicroVAX 3100 Model 88
 MicroVAX 3100 Model 90
 MicroVAX 3100 Model 95
 MicroVAX 3100 Model 96
 MicroVAX 3100 Model 98
 MicroVAX 3300
 MicroVAX 3400
 MicroVAX 3500
 MicroVAX 3600
 MicroVAX 3800
 MicroVAX 3900

VAXserver 

 VAXserver 3000
 VAXserver 3100
 VAXserver 3300
 VAXserver 3400
 VAXserver 3500
 VAXserver 3600
 VAXserver 3602
 VAXserver 3800
 VAXserver 3900
 VAXserver 4000 Model 200
 VAXserver 4000 Model 300
 VAXserver 6000 Model 210
 VAXserver 6000 Model 220
 VAXserver 6000 Model 310
 VAXserver 6000 Model 320
 VAXserver 6000 Model 410
 VAXserver 6000 Model 420
 VAXserver 6000 Model 510
 VAXserver 6000 Model 520
 VAXserver 9000 Model 110
 VAXserver 9000 Model 3x0
 VAXserver 9000 Model 310/Model 310VP
 VAXserver 9000 Model 320/Model 320VP
 VAXserver 9000 Model 330/Model 330VP
 VAXserver 9000 Model 340/Model 340VP

VAXstation 

 VAXstation I
 VAXstation II
 VAXstation II/GPX
 VAXstation 2000
 VAXstation 3100 Model 30
 VAXstation 3100 Model 38
 VAXstation 3100 Model 40
 VAXstation 3100 Model 48
 VAXstation 3100 Model 76
 VAXstation 3200
 VAXstation 3500
 VAXstation 3520
 VAXstation 3540
 VAXstation 4000 Model 30 (VAXstation 4000 VLC)
 VAXstation 4000 Model 60
 VAXstation 4000 Model 90
 VAXstation 4000 Model 90A
 VAXstation 4000 Model 96
 VAXstation 8000
 VT1300
 VXT 2000

VAX 6000 

 VAX 6000 Model 2x0 (also known as the VAX 62x0)
 VAX 6000 Model 3x0 (also known as the VAX 63x0)
 VAX 6333
 VAX 6000 Model 4x0
 VAX 6000 Model 5x0
 VAX 6000 Model 6x0

VAX 4000 

 VAX 4000 Model 50
 VAX 4000 Model 100
 VAX 4000 Model 100A
 VAX 4000 Model 105A
 VAX 4000 Model 106A
 VAX 4000 Model 108
 VAX 4000 Model 200
 VAX 4000 Model 300
 VAX 4000 Model 400
 VAX 4000 Model 500
 VAX 4000 Model 500A
 VAX 4000 Model 505A
 VAX 4000 Model 600
 VAX 4000 Model 600A
 VAX 4000 Model 700A
 VAX 4000 Model 705A

VAX 9000 

 VAX 9000 Model 110
 VAX 9000 Model 210
 VAX 9000 Model 210VP
 VAX 9000 Model 310
 VAX 9000 Model 410
 VAX 9000 Model 420
 VAX 9000 Model 430
 VAX 9000 Model 440

VAXft 

 VAXft Model 310 (also known as the VAXft 3000 Model 310)
 VAXft Model 110
 VAXft Model 410
 VAXft Model 610
 VAXft Model 612
 VAXft Model 810
 VAXft 110 Server
 VAXft 310 Server
 VAXft 410 Server
 VAXft 610 Server

VAX 7000 

 VAX 7000 Model 600
 VAX 7000 Model 700
 VAX 7000 Model 800

VAX 10000 

 VAX 10000 Model 600

References

DEC computers
Lists of computer hardware